Jason "Jay" Mehler (born September 8, 1971) is an American musician. He was touring lead guitar player for British rock band Kasabian from 2006 to 2013, when he quit to become a full time member of Beady Eye, until their disbanding in late 2014. Mehler continued as a session and touring musician for Liam Gallagher since 2017.

Career

Kasabian
During the recording of Kasabian's second album, Empire (2006), Christopher Karloff, one of the band's guitarists and songwriters, left the band due to "creative and artistic differences". Jay Mehler was his replacement.

He was a permanent touring member of Kasabian, although he was not involved with most of the promotional work that the band did. While he is not credited on Empire, Jay plays on the b-sides to the singles released off the album and also features in the video for the song "Empire".

Beady Eye

On March 7, 2013, it was announced that Jay was leaving Kasabian and had joined Beady Eye on bass guitar. Mehler stayed with the band until their disbandment in October 2014.

Liam Gallagher

Mehler is currently touring with former Oasis and Beady Eye lead singer Liam Gallagher, having released his solo debut in 2017.

Equipment
Mehler uses Gretsch guitars live accompanied by Vox amplifiers, notably the AC30CC2X. He also has been seen using Marshall Bluesbreakers. He uses a Blackstar HT-Dual pedal to create his tone, with him saying the pedal is the "base of his live sound". He has also been seen using a Univibe pedal, a Boss TR-2 Tremolo, a Boss tuner and the Small Clone and Small Stone from Electro Harmonix. For Liam Gallagher's solo tour, Mehler uses a Fender Bassbreaker and a Marshall 4x12 cab. His guitars include a Gibson Les Paul and a Gibson 355.

References

American expatriates in the United Kingdom
American rock guitarists
American male guitarists
Living people
Beady Eye members
Kasabian
1971 births
Guitarists from Philadelphia